Sycosis is an inflammation of hair follicles, especially of the beard area, and generally classified as papulopustular and chronic.

Types
Types include:
 Sycosis barbae
 Lupoid sycosis
 Tinea sycosis
 Herpetic sycosis

References

Bacterium-related cutaneous conditions